Qalailabiob (Qal'ai Labiob) is a village and jamoat in Tajikistan. It is located in Tojikobod District, one of the Districts of Republican Subordination. The jamoat has a total population of 11,102 (2015). The jamoat includes the village Tojikobod, the seat of the district, and 10 other villages.

Notes

References

Populated places in Districts of Republican Subordination
Jamoats of Tajikistan